is a specialty shiokara of Odawara, Kanagawa Prefecture, in Japan. 

It is made by pickling the entrails of bonito (katsuo), fermenting them for more than six months, then chopping them up and sometimes adding a mixture of sake, honey, and mirin to them. There is also a tuna (maguro) type that has a milder character. The name of the dish means "sake thief" and is derived from the fact that it is a good side dish for sake. 

There are variations of shuto, such as hot pepper, green onions and others. The combination of the shutō and Japanese sake creates a wonderful culinary match.

Although this dish is quite salty, the sake and honey add a depth to the flavor that may take several samplings to fully appreciate. As a result of the saltiness, a favored method for savoring this dish is to savor a small bite and then follow it with either a drink of alcohol or a bite of rice.

References

Japanese seafood